Slave of Kiss is the first EP released by Nana Kitade. "Kiss" is a cover of a Princess Princess song of the same name. A month later, the song was placed on the Princess Princess tribute album, "14 Princess ~Princess Princess Children~" as track #2. The EP includes an English version of Kitade's fifth single, "Kiss or Kiss". The A-side of this EP track #4 "sweet frozen kiss" is featured on her second album "I scream" . The EP reached #79 on the Oricon chart and stayed on the chart for a total of one week. At this point of her career, Kitade drastically changed her clothing to Gothic Lolita for the "Kiss" video.

Track listing

Video
The video for Kitade's cover of "Kiss" features her singing in her new changed Gothic Lolita look in a yellow background, spinning, and one Nana Kitade singing and another one next to her staring into the camera.

Charts

2006 EPs
Nana Kitade EPs
Japanese-language EPs